Akshay Johar, known professionally as MojoJojo, is an Indian DJ and record producer. Having made his debut as a bass guitarist with the rock band Paradigm Shift, he later gained more prominence as an independent artist and producer.

MojoJojo began playing piano at the age of ten and later picked up guitar during his time at college. After playing as bassist in such bands as the Gravy Train and The Doppler Effect, he made a transition into record production in 2015. His debut album, "Shots Fired" was released in 2015, earning him accolades including a Radio City Freedom Award for Best Electronica Artist and a nomination for a Global Indian Music Academy Award.

Early life
Akshay Johar was born in New Delhi; he attended the Delhi Public School, R.K. Puram, where he developed a keen interest in music. He learnt piano and acoustic guitar during his time there, but did not immediately pursue a career music. It was only during his final years in school that he joined a band and started playing bass. MojoJojo completed his higher education in New Delhi; he continued his association with music, performing with such artists and indie bands as Paradigm Shift, Gravy Train Barefaced Liar and The Doppler Effect during his college years.

Career
Following his time as a bass guitarist with Prateek Kuhad's band in 2014, MojoJojo decided to pursue a full-time career in record production. In 2015, he made his music debut with an Extended play "Bass Bahar", which was a collection of remixed Bollywood music and was released in 2015. His first full-length album, the electronic music collection entitled "Shots Fired" came out later that year. It was released on October 1, under the label of Times Music and had nine tracks featuring other musicians including KR$NA, Sound Avtar, Tanya Nambiar and Bawari Basanti.

Talking to RSJOnline.com, MojoJojo discussed the creative process - which began with writing the lyrics for such tracks as "Storm" in late 2014 - saying that he wanted to go beyond the conventions of EDM: "My contention with that grouping is that it’s looked upon more as a trend and a fad, [an] easy route to become popular and got a negative connotation". "Storm" featured vocals from classical artist Bawari Basanti and piano and cello parts that where recorded live, while another track, "Nepal" had live drums. MojoJojo talked about the experimental nature of the album in an interview with Mumbai Mirror, saying: "I was trying to find my sound — each song on it was a different sub-genre of — from drum ’n’ bass to moombahton to future bass".

The album was well received at the time of its release, with "Storm" earning him a nomination for the Best Electronic Track at the 2016 Global Indian Music Academy Awards. Another song on the album, "Thar Bomb", which featured tribal chants from the Thar region also won him the Best Electonica Artist at Radio City Freedom Awards.

MojoJojo has since released several singles. His second EP entitled “Sapne”, was released to a positive response from audiences in 2018. His second album, "Andarrated", has been released as well.

Discography

Studio albums

Singles and collaborations

References

External links
 

1989 births
21st-century Indian musicians
Indian DJs
Living people
Electronic dance music DJs
Sirius XM Radio programs
Indian record producers